The Maxus G20 is a large luxury MPV or minivan launched on the Chinese car market in April 2019 during the Shanghai Auto Show by Maxus. Maxus is a sub-brand owned by the Shanghai Automotive Industry Corporation (SAIC). The G20 is similar to the Maxus G10 MPV released in 2014 and has a heavily redesigned interior and exterior.

Overview

The G20 is available in three models: Luxury, Luxury Executive and Deluxe. Price of the Maxus G20 ranges from CN¥183,800 to 289,800.

A hydrogen powered fuel cell concept of the G20 the G20FC was unveiled at the 2019 Shanghai Auto Show. The G20FC is claimed to be world's first fuel cell multi purpose vehicle (MPV).

References

External links

 Maxus G20 (Chinese)

G20
Minivans
Cars introduced in 2019
Rear-wheel-drive vehicles